Sodaville is a city in Linn County, Oregon, United States. The population was 308 at the 2010 census.

The city's name comes from the nearby Sodaville Mineral Springs. A post office at Sodaville operated from 1871 to 1933.

Geography

Demographics

2010 census
As of the census of 2010, there were 308 people, 116 households, and 85 families living in the city. The racial makeup of the city was 89.3% White, 0.6% African American, 1.6% Native American, 1.0% Asian, 0.3% from other races, and 7.1% from two or more races. Hispanic or Latino of any race were 1.9% of the population.

There were 116 households, of which 34.5% had children under the age of 18 living with them, 62.1% were married couples living together, 6.0% had a female householder with no husband present, 5.2% had a male householder with no wife present, and 26.7% were non-families. 19.0% of all households were made up of individuals, and 8.6% had someone living alone who was 65 years of age or older. The average household size was 2.66 and the average family size was 3.08.

The median age in the city was 43.5 years. 24.7% of residents were under the age of 18; 6.8% were between the ages of 18 and 24; 20.1% were from 25 to 44; 35.4% were from 45 to 64; and 13% were 65 years of age or older. The gender makeup of the city was 51.9% male and 48.1% female.

2000 census
As of the census of 2000, there were 290 people, 105 households, and 80 families living in the city. The population density was 921.0 people per square mile (361.2/km). There were 115 housing units at an average density of 365.2 per square mile (143.2/km). The racial makeup of the city was 92.07% White, 0.69% African American, 1.38% Native American, 2.07% Asian, 0.69% Pacific Islander, 1.38% from other races, and 1.72% from two or more races. Hispanic or Latino of any race were 4.14% of the population.

There were 105 households, out of which 37.1% had children under the age of 18 living with them, 61.0% were married couples living together, 10.5% had a female householder with no husband present, and 22.9% were non-families. 18.1% of all households were made up of individuals, and 7.6% had someone living alone who was 65 years of age or older. The average household size was 2.76 and the average family size was 3.15.

In the city, the population was spread out, with 29.0% under the age of 18, 6.2% from 18 to 24, 28.3% from 25 to 44, 24.5% from 45 to 64, and 12.1% who were 65 years of age or older. The median age was 38 years. For every 100 females, there were 94.6 males. For every 100 females age 18 and over, there were 94.3 males.

The median income for a household in the city was $41,875, and the median income for a family was $45,682. Males had a median income of $28,750 versus $21,875 for females. The per capita income for the city was $14,596. About 7.7% of families and 8.9% of the population were below the poverty line, including 12.7% of those under the age of eighteen and 3.2% of those 65 or over.

References

External links
 
 Entry for Sodaville in the Oregon Blue Book
 "Memories Spring Eternal in Sodaville – Corvallis Gazette-Times

Cities in Oregon
Cities in Linn County, Oregon
Spa towns in Oregon
1880 establishments in Oregon
Populated places established in 1880